XHITD-FM is a radio station in Durango, Durango. Branded as Estéreo Tecnológico, XHITD-FM broadcasts on 92.1 FM and is owned by the Instituto Tecnológico de Durango.

History
XHITD signed on April 4, 1990 as the first FM station in the entire state of Durango.

The Instituto Tecnológico de Durango received a permit for an FM radio station in 1992. Originally badged XHDGO-FM and broadcasting on 97.3 MHz, within several months the callsign and frequency were changed. (The 97.3 frequency in Durango remains vacant, but the XHDGO-FM calls were reissued in 1994.)

XHITD does not appear in the most recent IFT table release, dated March 31, 2016, likely because it failed to apply to transition to a public or social use concession.

References

Radio stations in Durango
Mass media in Durango City
University radio stations in Mexico
Mexican radio stations with expired concessions